Costa Rica at the Pan American Games.

Medal count

References

 
Pan American Games